CRAF may refer to:

 Canadian Charter of Rights and Freedoms
 Civil Reserve Air Fleet
 Comet Rendezvous Asteroid Flyby
 Committee on Radio Astronomy Frequencies
 Cuban Revolutionary Armed Forces

See also 
 C-Raf, a human enzyme encoded by the RAF1 gene